The Amalgamated Weavers' Association, often known as the Weavers' Amalgamation, was a trade union in the United Kingdom.  Initially, it operated in competition with the North East Lancashire Amalgamated Weavers' Association in part of its area, and it was therefore nicknamed the Second Amalgamation.

History
The union was founded in 1884 as the Northern Counties Amalgamated Association of Weavers, with the participation of thirty-four local trade unions:

The majority of the union's members were female: in 1894, 45,000 of its 80,000 total membership were women.  This was unusual; outside the cotton industry, very few women were members of trade unions.  By 1937, membership had risen to 94,000, and the proportion of women had grown further, to a total of 75,000 of its members.

For many years, the union campaigned against the practice of steaming in cotton mills.

The union took its final name in 1923.  In 1974, it merged with the National Union of Textile and Allied Workers to form the Amalgamated Textile Workers' Union.

Affiliated membership
The total membership of the union's affiliates grew steadily, peaked in 1922, then fell almost continuously until the union was dissolved.

Leadership

General Secretaries
1884: Thomas Birtwistle
1885: William Henry Wilkinson
1906: Joseph Cross
1925: John C. Parker
1927: Andrew Naesmith
1953: Lewis Wright
1968: Harry Kershaw
1971: Fred Hague

Presidents
1884: David Holmes
1906: David Shackleton
1911: John William Ogden
1930: James Hindle
1937: James Bell
1947: Carey Hargreaves
1949: Lewis Wright
1954: Harold Bradley
1960: Ernest Thornton
1964: Fred Hague
1970: Hilda Unsworth

References

Defunct trade unions of the United Kingdom
Cotton industry trade unions
1884 establishments in the United Kingdom
1974 disestablishments in the United Kingdom
Trade unions established in 1884
Trade unions disestablished in 1974
Trade unions based in Greater Manchester